These are the official results of the Women's High Jump event at the 1999 IAAF World Championships in Athletics in Seville, Spain. There were a total number of 31 participating athletes, with two qualifying groups and the final held on Sunday 29 August 1999 at 18:45h.

Medalists

Schedule
All times are Central European Time (UTC+1)

Abbreviations
All results shown are in metres

Results

Qualifying round
Qualification: Qualifying Performance 1.94 (Q) or at least 12 best performers (q) advance to the final.

Final

References
 IAAF
 Results
 trackandfieldnews

H
High jump at the World Athletics Championships
1999 in women's athletics